This article provides a summary of results for the general elections to the Canadian province of New Brunswick's unicameral legislative body, the Legislative Assembly of New Brunswick. Prior to 1892, New Brunswick had a bicameral legislature, but its Upper House – the Legislative Council – was not elected. The number of seats has varied over time – from 41 at the time of Canadian Confederation, to a high of fifty-eight from 1967 through 1991, to the level of 55 since the 1995 election. Changing again in 2013 to 49 seats at which it remains today.   

Beginning with the 37th New Brunswick general election in 2010, elections in New Brunswick are – in general – held on fixed dates on the fourth Monday of September every four years. The date may be varied by one week earlier or later in cases of the fourth Monday of September being a date of cultural or religious significance and may be varied one month earlier or later in cases of a federal election being held during the same period. The Lieutenant-Governor of New Brunswick also has the power to call an election on another date in the event of a loss of confidence in the legislature.

The chart on the upper right shows the information graphically, with the most recent elections towards the right. It shows that New Brunswick has effectively a two-party system – the Liberals (red) and the Conservatives (blue); along with the one-off success of the Confederation of Regions party (green) in 1991. It also shows the Liberal party's clean sweep of seats in 1987, one of the few instances in history when a party won all the seats in a national or sub-national legislature. Since provincial parties were officially recognised, the Liberal party have won eleven out of twenty elections.

This article only covers elections since the province became part of the Canadian Confederation in 1867. Prior to becoming part of Canada, New Brunswick was a British colony; and the New Brunswick House of Assembly was first formed in 1784 – when New Brunswick separated from Nova Scotia.

1866–1934
New Brunswick joined the Canadian confederation in 1867. Between 1917 and 1935, party lines had developed, but were not recognized by electoral law. Before this, only "Government" and "Opposition" were used. The results are listed below.

1935–present
Between 1935 and 1974, some ridings were multi member seats – i.e., more than one Member of the Legislative Assembly was elected from certain ridings. Political parties were officially recognized and registered beginning in 1935. Since 1974, each riding (electoral district) has elected only one member to the Legislative Assembly of New Brunswick.

Notes
  Includes results for Progressive Conservatives.
  The Confederation of Regions Party only contested the 1991, 1995 and 1999 elections.

See also
 Timeline of Canadian elections
 General elections in New Brunswick (pre-Confederation)
 List of political parties in New Brunswick

References

Bibliography
  (results back to 1956)

External links
 Office of the NB Chief Electoral Officer
 Legislative Library of New Brunswick: New Brunswick Elections Database

2
New Brunswick General Elections
Elections, General Elections (Post-Confederation)